Adriaan Pieter 'André' Esterhuizen (born 30 March 1994 in Klerksdorp) is a South African rugby union player for the South Africa national team and Harlequins in the English Premiership. His regular position is centre or full-back.

Career

Youth

Esterhuizen represented his local side  at the Under-13 Craven Week competition in 2007, at the Under-16 Grant Khomo Week in 2010 and at the Under-18 Craven Week in 2011.

He started twelve of the  side's matches during the 2013 Under-21 Provincial Championship competition, finishing as the joint top try scorer in Division A of that competition with 9 tries.

He was included in the South Africa Under-20 side for the 2014 IRB Junior World Championship.

Senior career

His first taste of first class rugby came for the  during the 2013 Vodacom Cup competition.

Esterhuizen was included in the  wider training squad prior to the 2014 Super Rugby season, scoring a try for them in their warm-up match against Saracens and was subsequently selected in the final Super Rugby squad for 2014.

He joined Premiership Rugby side Harlequins ahead of the 2020–21 season.

He won his first Premiership title and started as Harlequins won the game 40-38 in the highest scoring Premiership final ever on 26 June 2021.

References

External links
 
 

South African rugby union players
Living people
1994 births
People from Klerksdorp
Sharks (Currie Cup) players
Sharks (rugby union) players
Rugby union centres
South Africa Under-20 international rugby union players
South Africa international rugby union players
Munakata Sanix Blues players
Harlequin F.C. players
Rugby union players from Potchefstroom